The men's 58 kg  competition in taekwondo at the 2004 Summer Olympics in Athens took place on August 26 at the Faliro Coastal Zone Olympic Complex.

Chu Mu-yen collected one of Chinese Taipei's first ever Olympic gold medals at these Games in the event after beating Mexico's Óscar Salazar 5–1 in their final match. Meanwhile, the bronze medal was awarded to Egyptian fighter Tamer Bayoumi, who easily thwarted Spain's Juan Antonio Ramos in the repechage final 7–1. Despite high hopes, Greece's home favorite Michalis Mouroutsos missed his Olympic title defense after losing the quarterfinal match 2–8 to Bayoumi.

Competition format
The main bracket consisted of a single elimination tournament, culminating in the gold medal match. The taekwondo fighters eliminated in earlier rounds by the two finalists of the main bracket advanced directly to the repechage tournament. These matches determined the bronze medal winner for the event.

Schedule
All times are Greece Standard Time (UTC+2)

Results
Legend
PTG — Won by points gap
SUP — Won by superiority
OT — Won on over time (Golden Point)
WO — Walkover

Main bracket

Repechage

References

External links
Official Report

Men's 058 kg
Men's events at the 2004 Summer Olympics